Drosera capillaris, the pink or spathulate-leaved sundew (not to be confused with Drosera spatulata), is a small carnivorous plant of the family Droseraceae in the genus Drosera. They are frequently found in wet pine flatwoods and bogs of the southeastern United States, ranging from eastern Texas east to Florida and north to Virginia, as well as in some areas of the Caribbean. They thrive in moist, acidic soil.

D. capillaris is a small plant, usually ranging from 2 to 4 cm in diameter, but in wet habitats it has been known to grow up to 7 cm. In strong sun the entire plant appears red with round, spoon-shaped leaf blades sporting numerous tentacles. In normal light, the leaves are lime-green and the tentacles red. The leaves are arranged in a rosette and generally lie flat on the ground.

Some individuals of this species act as annuals and some as perennials. Germination occurs throughout the fall, and germination time varies over a matter of months. The flowers are pink and typically show up in April. However, these plants flower over a huge range of times and sizes, and some individuals complete their life cycles within a year while others survive for two or more years.

It is not unusual to see D. capillaris, along with their relative the Drosera brevifolia (the dwarf sundew), carpet large areas so thickly it is hard to walk without stepping on tens of them growing out of wet sand or long-fiber sphagnum or just overflowing from a road-side ditch. Both sundews commonly live side-by-side with American pitcher plants (Sarracenia), butterworts, and bladderworts.

References

 Drosera capillaris Poir. at Wildflower.org

Carnivorous plants of North America
capillaris
Flora of the Southeastern United States
Flora of the Caribbean
Plants described in 1804
Flora without expected TNC conservation status